The Austro Engine GIAE110R is an Austrian aircraft engine, designed and produced by Austro Engine of Wiener Neustadt for use in light aircraft.

As of 2015 the engine is not listed as available on the company website and may not have been developed past prototype stage.

Design and development
The engine is a twin rotor four-stroke, air and liquid-cooled, gasoline Wankel engine design, with a mechanical gearbox reduction drive, employing a helical gear set, with reduction ratio of 2.96:1. It employs dual capacitor discharge ignition and produces  at 7500 rpm.

Specifications (GIAE110R)

See also

References

Austro Engine aircraft engines
Aircraft Wankel engines